Gnathophausia zoea is a species of lophogastrid crustacean. It is widely distributed in the Atlantic Ocean from the Arctic Circle to the Equator; in the Pacific Ocean, it is more restricted to tropical areas.

This Species has also been knows as: Gnathophausia cristata Illig, 1906 (synonym); Gnathophausia sarsii Wood-Mason & Alcock, 1891 (synonym) and Gnathophausia willemoesii G.O. Sars, 1883 (synonym).

References

External links

Malacostraca
Crustaceans described in 1875